Zet is a clone x86 architecture microprocessor that is machine code–compatible with x86 processors, developed as an effort to make an open-hardware CPU.

The hardware design can be synthesized in a configurable device such an FPGA, CPLD, or on a custom ASIC, and is considered to be an SoC.

As of now, the project only supports 16-bit, and is able to run DOS-compatible or Windows 3.x operating systems.

There has been no activity on the Zet project since 2013.

References

External links
Zet Processor
zet86 at OpenCores

Open microprocessors
Soft microprocessors
X86 architecture